Ritu Menon is an Indian feminist, writer and publisher.

Career
In 1984, Menon co-founded Kali for Women, India's first exclusively feminist publishing house, along with Urvashi Butalia, her longtime collaborator. In 2003, Kali for Women shut shop due to lack of commercial viability compounded by irreconcilable personal differences between Menon and Butalia. Thereafter, Menon independently founded Women Unlimited, another feminist publishing house.

She has also written numerous newspaper articles and op-eds. Her writing focuses on violence against women, religion's take on women and the gender divide across the society from a strongly feminist and left-wing perspective.

Over a Zoom call, she talked about Address Book: A Publishing Memoir in the time of COVID, which she wrote during the pandemic without an explicit plan to publish a book. “It became a form of putting down what I was going through, remembering, thinking, reading, and worrying about,” she says (13 July 2021).

Publications 

 The Unfinished Business, Outlook, May 2001
Anti-CAA protests by Muslim women are about where, how and why you belong, Indian Express, Feb 2020
Borders & Boundaries: Women in India's Partition
Unequal Citizens: A Study of Muslim Women in India
From Mathura to Manorama: Resisting Violence Against Women in India
address book: a publishing memoir in the time of covid

Honour
In 2000-2001 she served on the International Advisory Board of the Raja Rao Award for Literature. In 2011, Menon and Butalia were jointly conferred the Padma Shri, India's fourth-highest civilian award, by the Government of India.

References

External links
 About Ritu Menon, Women Unlimited
 About Ritu Menon, Women's World

Indian feminist writers
Living people
Recipients of the Padma Shri in literature & education
Indian women publishers
Indian publishers (people)
English-language writers from India
20th-century Indian journalists
Women writers from Delhi
Indian women journalists
20th-century Indian women writers
20th-century Indian businesswomen
20th-century Indian businesspeople
20th-century publishers (people)
Businesswomen from Delhi
21st-century Indian businesswomen
21st-century Indian businesspeople
Year of birth missing (living people)